The growing popularity of roller skating in the United States led to the formation of organized multi-day endurance races for cash prizes as early as the mid-1880s. Speed and endurance races continued to be held on both flat and banked tracks in the century's first three decades and spectators enjoyed the spills and falls of the skaters. The term "roller derby" was used to refer to such races by 1922.

Associations 
There are a multitude of roller derby associations in the United States.
 Men's Roller Derby Association (MRDA) – 68 member leagues as of September 2019
 Modern Athletic Derby Endeavor (MADE) – 8 member leagues
 Junior Roller Derby Association (JRDA) – 118 junior roller derby member leagues as of Dec 2017
 Roller Derby Coalition of Leagues (RDCL) – 8 banked track member leagues as of September 2019
 USA Roller Sports (USARS) – 57 member leagues (combines all age and gender divisions)
 Women's Flat Track Derby Association (WFTDA) – 460 member leagues as of September 2019

Leagues
Due to historical accident, the term "league" in modern roller derby means something more akin to a football club than to a traditional sports league thus, there are a very large number of leagues sometimes even including two or more based in a single city.

See also

 Roller derby
 List of roller derby associations
 List of roller derby leagues 
 History of roller derby

References

 
Roller derby
United States